Lake Sylvia State Park is a  state-operated, public recreation area in the northern part of Montesano in Grays Harbor County, Washington. The park is located in dense temperate rain forest.

The park offers swimming, hiking, camping, fishing, and non-motored boating. It was built around an old lumber mill pond, which was used for a few years to power the town's first electrical generation plant. The rustic dam that powered the mill and the power plant remains at the western end of the lake and feeds the lower reaches of Sylvia Creek.

The area was originally homesteaded in the late 1860s by Michael F. Luark, who built Grays Harbor County's first water-powered sawmill there in 1871. The present dam was built around 1909; its penstock (now mostly demolished) provided the power for a generator house alongside the creek, down below. The generator and lake provided power and water for Montesano into the early 1930s, when the powerhouse was dismantled; Silas and Elsie Wilder lived over the generator room, where they raised 14 children and operated the generator. Elsie Wilder was almost certainly the only woman in the United States to operate a power plant in the 1920s; it is not clear whether there have been any since. The property passed to Washington State Parks in 1936.

Today, the park is home to a mixed flock of mallard ducks and Canada geese. A family of ospreys, as well as occasional bald eagles, also occupy the lake area. There is also a small group of beavers living along Sylvia Creek, which flows from the lake.

The municipal watershed of Montesano lies above the head of the lake, at the eastern end of Lake Sylvia, and is accessible by foot through the park. The city watershed is managed very similarly to a national forest and serves as a corridor for wildlife to enter and leave the park and the northern parts of the town.

References

External links 
Lake Sylvia State Park Washington State Parks and Recreation Commission 
Lake Sylvia State Park Map Washington State Parks and Recreation Commission

Parks in Grays Harbor County, Washington
State parks of Washington (state)